Aliabad (also Romanized as ‘Alīābād) is a village in Firuzeh Rural District, in the Central District of Firuzeh County, Razavi Khorasan Province, Iran. At the 2006 census, its population was 108, in 26 families.

See also 

 List of cities, towns and villages in Razavi Khorasan Province

References 

Populated places in Firuzeh County